Steven Allen Breedlove (born 1950) is an American prelate of the Anglican Church in North America. He was elected as the first Presider Bishop of PEARUSA, a missionary district that was formerly part of the Anglican Church of Rwanda, in 2012. In 2016, Breedlove became the first diocesan bishop of the Anglican Diocese of Christ Our Hope.

Biography 
Breedlove was born in Tyler, Texas to First Lieutenant James Robby Breedlove and Paula Kent. He graduated from Robert E. Lee High School and attended Washington and Lee University for undergraduate studies. He then obtained Master of Theology and Doctor of Ministry degrees from Dallas Theological Seminary, writing a dissertation based on case studies in team ministry at Bethany Chapel in Calgary, Alberta, where he was the senior pastor from 1990 to 1997. He was a non-denominational Christian pastor for 29 years prior to converting to Anglicanism in 2001.

In 2005, Breedlove was ordained as a priest of the Anglican Church of Rwanda and served as a pastor at the Church of the Apostles. Later that year, he founded All Saints Church in Chapel Hill, North Carolina, serving as the church's rector. He was also the founder and director of the Anglican Missional Pastor leadership program developed for men and women entering ordained ministry.

After the withdrawal of the Anglican Mission in the Americas, Breedlove was unanimously elected the first Presider Bishop pro tem of PEARUSA, the new missionary district of the Anglican Church of Rwanda in the United States, a dual church body of the Anglican Church of Rwanda and the Anglican Church in North America, and was appointed by Archbishop Onesphore Rwaje. He was installed on 11 June 2012. Bishop Breedlove's consecration took place on 29 October 2012, in Denver, Colorado, by Archbishop Robert Duncan.

Breedlove became the first diocesan bishop of the newly constituted Anglican Diocese of Christ Our Hope on 21 June 2016 upon the dissolution of PEARUSA resulting from its transfer from the Province of the Anglican Church of Rwanda to the Anglican Church in North America.

On April 5, 2022, a group of survivors from the Anglican Diocese of Christ Our Hope came forward alleging abuse by Reverend Dan Claire at Church of the Resurrection. They claimed that diocesan leaders, including Breedlove, failed to adequately hold "Claire accountable and did not center the needs of survivors." The survivor complaints resulted in an investigation into Breedlove's handing of the abuse allegations, conducted by Grand River Solutions. 

On Thursday June 17, 2021 the College of Bishops of the Anglican Church in North America elected Alan Hawkins as Bishop Coadjutor of the Anglican Diocese of Christ Our Hope. Hawkins will serve alongside Breedlove until Breedlove transitions out of episcopal ministry.

He has been married to Sally Breedlove, a writer, since 1972 and they have five children and fourteen grandchildren. In 2009, Breedlove co-wrote the book The Shame Exchange - Trading Shame for God's Mercy and Freedom with his wife and Ralph and Jennifer Ennis.

References

External links
Steve Breedlove Biography. .

|-

Living people
21st-century Anglican bishops in the United States
Bishops of the Anglican Church in North America
Christians from Texas
Converts to Anglicanism from Congregationalism
Dallas Theological Seminary alumni
Former evangelicals
People from Tyler, Texas
Religious leaders from Texas
Washington and Lee University alumni
1950 births